Jan van Eeckele or Van Eekele or Van Heckele (1520 – 1561) was an Early Netherlandish painter active in Bruges.

Van Eeckele became a master of the Guild of St. Luke in Bruges in 1534, where he remained until his death. Works by him shown at the 1902 Exposition des primitifs flamands à Bruges were a Mater Dolorosa from the cathedral of St Salvator in Bruges, and a Lactatio Bernardi from the church of the Black (Augustinian) Sisters. In his critical catalog of the 1902 exhibition, Georges Hulin de Loo  stated that Jan van Eeckele is the same person as the Monogrammist J.V.E.

References

1520 births
1561 deaths
Early Netherlandish painters
Artists from Bruges